A total of 718 candidates contested the 2022 Lebanese general election, running on 103 lists.

Electoral lists 

 Bold : Elected in 2018 and running in 2022.  
 ★ and Italic : Elected in 2022 
 Strikethrough: Withdrawn from list.

These lists were released by the Ministry of Interior.

Beirut 1 (East Beirut) – 8 seats

Beirut 2 (West Beirut) – 11 seats

Bekaa 1 (Zahle) – 7 seats

Bekaa 2 (West Bekaa – Rashaya) – 6 seats

Bekaa 3 (Baalbek – Hermel) – 10 seats

Mount Lebanon 1 (Keserwan – Jbeil) – 8 seats

Mount Lebanon 2 (Matn) – 8 seats

Mount Lebanon 3 (Baabda) – 6 seats

Mount Lebanon 4 (Aley – Chouf)  – 13 seats

North 1 (Akkar) – 7 seats

North 2 (Tripoli – Dennieh – Minnieh) – 11 seats

North 3 (Bcharre – Zgharta – Koura – Batroun) – 10 seats

South 1 (Saida – Jezzine) – 5 seats

South 2 (Tyre – Zahrani) – 7 seats

South 3 (Nabatieh – Bint Jbeil – Hasbaya – Marjaayoun) – 11 seats

Result by candidate

References 

Lists of Lebanese political candidates
Elections in Lebanon